John Ker (1819–1886) was a Scottish ecclesiastical writer and minister in the United Presbyterian Church.

Biography
Ker was born in Tweedmuir 1819. He was educated at the University of Edinburgh, he then spent some time in Germany in post-graduate work. He became pastor of East Campbell Church, Glasgow, in 1851; and in 1876 was appointed professor of practical training in the United Presbyterian Theological Hall. He died in 1886.

Memorials
A marble bust of Ker, sculpted by Charles McBride, stands in New College in Edinburgh

Works
Among his published works are: 
Sermons (1868–88)
The Psalms in History and Biography (1886)
Scottish Nationality (1887)
The History of Preaching (1888)
Letters (1890)

Notes

References

Further reading
 

1819 births
1886 deaths
Ministers of the United Presbyterian Church (Scotland)